Roberto Fernandes (born 2 November 1971) is a former Indian football player who played as a defender. He appeared in 29 international matches for India national team. Fernandes spent his majority of career by playing for Goan club Salgaocar FC.

He has also played for other Goan clubs such as Churchill Brothers S.C. and Vasco SC. Fernandes has represented India in tournaments like 1998 Asian Games, and Nehru Cup. In 2000, he moved to Belize and played for Belize Premier Football League side San Pedro Seahawks until 2001.

Club career

Early years
Fernandes began his professional club career in 1991, at Salcete FC, that participated in the Goa First Division. He later moved to Goan giants Churchill Brothers and Salgaocar, with whom he spent most of his times.

Churchill Brothers
On 1 July 1993, he signed with Churchill Brothers and appeared in the Goa Professional League.

Salgaocar
In July 1995, he moved to Salgaocar and played under managers like Shabbir Ali, Leopold Fernandez.

Clubs in Mexico
On 1 July 1997, Fernandes moved abroad and signed with Mexican Primera División club Atlético Morelia. He later joined C.F. Monterrey in January 1998.

Back in Salgaocar
After rejoining Salgaocar, Fernandes was part of the team that emerged as one of the strongest sides in India as they clinched 1998–99 National Football League, 1997 Indian Federation Cup, 1998 and 1999 editions of Indian Super Cup.

San Pedro Seahawks
In 2000, he again moved abroad and appeared with the Belize Premier Football League side San Pedro Seahawks, on loan transfer from Salgaocar.

Back again in Salgaocar
After spending a season with Seahawks, Fernandes rejoined Salgaocar and played until 2006. As veteran defender for Salgaocar, was part of club's runners-up finish in the 2002–03 edition of National Football League.

International career
Fernandes debuted for India national team on 21 September 1996 against Philippines in a 1998 FIFA World Cup qualification match, that ended as 2–0 win for them. He later appeared in SAFF Gold Cup and helped the team winning trophies in 1997 and 1999. He was also in the national squad and played in 2000 AFC Asian Cup qualification matches but did not move on to final round.

Due to his brilliant performances as overlapping right back, Fernandes was included in the squad of Syed Nayeemuddin managed national team that participated in 1998 Asian Games in Bangkok. Their journey ended after finishing bottom of the second round. In July 2000, Fernandes was included in Sukhwinder Singh managed India national squad for their historic England-tour, where they played three matches against English Premier League sides Fulham, West Bromwich Albion, and arch-rival Bangladesh.

With India, he appeared in the 2002 World Cup Qualifiers, where they defeated teams like United Arab Emirates, Brunei and Yemen. India secured 11 points from 6 matches, same as Yemen, but finished behind them due to an inferior goal difference. In that year, Fernandes was part of Bhaichung Bhutia led Indian team that lifted the LG Cup, in which they defeated host nation Vietnam 3–2. In August 2002, he was called up to the national squad for 2003 Afro-Asian Games, and appeared in the tournament, in which India finished as runners-up behind Uzbekistan.

Honours
Salgaocar
National Football League: 1998–99
Goa Professional League: 1998, 2002, 2003, 2004
Federation Cup: 1997
Indian Super Cup: 1998, 1999

India
SAFF Gold Cup: 1997, 1999; third place: 2003
 South Asian Games Bronze medal: 1999
LG Cup: 2002

See also

 Goans in football
 List of Indian football players in foreign leagues
 List of India national football team captains

References

Bibliography

External links

Roberto Fernandes at FootballDatabase.eu (archived 12 November 2022)

Indian footballers
India international footballers
Association football defenders
1971 births
Living people
Footballers from Goa
Footballers at the 1998 Asian Games
Asian Games competitors for India
Indian expatriate footballers
South Asian Games medalists in football
South Asian Games bronze medalists for India